is an anime series produced by Tatsunoko Productions. The series features the adventures of a young bee named Hutch : the son of a Queen bee, Hutch is separated from his mother when his native beehive is destroyed by an attack of wasps. The series follows Hutch as he searches for his missing mother, in the midst of a frequently hostile nature.

A sequel, The New Adventures of Hutch the Honeybee, and numbering 26 episodes, was produced in 1974. The original series was remade in 1989 under the same Japanese title, Minashigo Hutch.

The original show (1971) is notable for its frequently sad and cruel scripts. In many episodes, Hutch would befriend another insect, only to see his new friend die a violent and painful death. In one, he befriended a female honey bee who lost her brothers and sisters to a hornet army. The 1989 remake, however, featured completely new episodes and a much more light-hearted story. On July 31, 2010, a movie which was a remake of show was released in Japan titled Hutch the Honeybee.

After being broadcast in several European countries, the show was re-edited and translated into English in 1996 by Saban Entertainment, with 65 out of 91 episodes being dubbed. Saban's edits cut out some of the show's violent material.

Plot 
The story begins with the queen bee hive being attacked and destroyed by an army of wasps, which kill almost all the bees inside and devour their eggs. The queen bee is forced to flee, but an egg is saved from the terrible slaughter, ending up hidden under a leaf. This egg is then found by a female bumblebee, the queen's handmaid, and taken by her as if it were one of her own. The little Hutch (in the Japanese version Hutch or Hacchi, as the protagonist is originally male, a bee drone) is thus raised by his adoptive mother Bumblebee with love but is despised and isolated by his half-brothers. Upon discovering that he is adopted and feeling like he was never fully accepted, Hutch decides to set out on a journey in search of his mother. Hutch subsequently experiences a great deal of adventures, meeting and befriending various animals such as butterflies, amphibians, mice, other bees, and caterpillars, though many meet tragic ends. Hutch also faces many enemies, such as spiders, toads, ants, wasps, hornets, snakes, moles, predatory birds, reptiles, praying mantises and even humans. During his journey Hutch meets another bee called Aya, who joins him on his search. Eventually Hutch finds his mother and saves her from certain death. He also discovers that Aya is actually his sister, who managed to survive to the wasps' attack at the beginning of the story. Hutch and his family rebuild the bee kingdom, vowing to make it peaceful and kind.

Voice cast
Chieko Honda as Teru
Haruko Kitahama as Mama
Junji Chiba as Piccolo
Masako Nozawa as Bunkichi
Minoru Midorikawa as Water Scorpion
Takeshi Watabe as Kamakiri
Toshiko Sawada as Narrator
Yoshiko Matsuo as Flower
Yoshiko Sakakibara as Queen
Yoshiko Yamamoto as Aya
Youko Kuri as Hutch
Yuuko Maruyama as Apachi

English dub cast
Joshua Seth as Hutch
Mari Devon as the Narrator
Edie Mirman as Honey Queen Bee
Heidi Lenhart as Haley
Frank Catalano as Hutch's Evil Twin Brother
Dorothy Elias-Fahn as various voices
R. Martin Klein as Dan Dan
Melodee Spevack as Hutch's Mother

Other foreign versions
The original series was broadcast in France, by TF1, and Quebec (Canada) starting in 1979, under the titles Le Petit Prince Orphelin (The little Orphan Prince) and Hutchy le Petit Prince Orphelin. The re-edited Saban version was broadcast in 1997, under the title Micky l'abeille (Micky the bee), with a new French dubbing.

In Italy, the show was broadcast by various local TV channels in the late 1970s as Le avventure dell'Ape Magà (The Adventures of Magà the Bee), a title similar to the more popular Maya the Bee, with a dub derived from the original Japanese version. In the Italian dubbing, the male character of Hutch was turned into a female bee like Maya, which created some awkward moments in the translations, such as in the episode which depicts Hutch falling in love with a female butterfly. The Italian dialogue sometimes left the character's gender unclear, generating some confusion. In 1997 a new dub, derived from the American version, aired on Italia 1 under the title Un alveare d'avventure per l'Ape Magà (A Hive of Adventures for Magà the Bee). In the second dub the gender of the main character is male, despite the name still being Magà.

The show was also broadcast in Spain by the television network Telecinco.

The show was fully dubbed to Arabic in 1984 by G.C.C Joint Program Production Institution, which based in Kuwait.

In Latin America, the show was broadcast as Josemiel in the 1980s, for Mexico, the original edition was sent in 1984 to be transmitted by Televisa and Canal 6, got a lot of appreciation by their fans due to the dramatic script and the not-translated Japanese intro and ending. Some years later, the remake named Las Aventuras de Hutch were transmitted also by Televisa, but as being adapted from the American version of the animation it got less popularity than the original series. In Brazil, it was broadcast by Rede Globo.

In Israel, it was broadcast in 1997 on Arutz HaYeladim as רון הדבורון (Ron HaDvoron; Ron the Little Bee).

In Philippines, it was featured as a TV Series with title "Hutch, Ang Batang Bubuyog", "Hutch, The Kiddie Bee".

In Germany, the series was named Flitz das Bienenkind (Filtz the bee child). The German dub was produced by Saban in 1994 and was based on the US dub. The original 91 episodes were cut together for a total of 65 episodes. The series premiered on ARD on 29 December 1996.

International Broadcast
 Japan
 Fuji TV
 Cartoon Network
 Australia
 Network Ten
 Nickelodeon
 United States
girlzChannel
Syndication
Boomerang
 Iran
 IRIB
 Indonesia
 SCTV (1997-2001)
 TV7 (2002-2004)
 Spacetoon (2005-2011; 2020)
 Rajawali Televisi (2018; 2021)
 Malaysia
 TV3
 Philippines
 TV5 - Dubbed in Tagalog with the title, Hutch ang Batang Bubuyog (Hutch the Young Bee)
 Bahrain
 Bahrain TV
 Italy
 Syndication
 South Korea
 KBS1
 Nickelodeon
 Thailand
 CH.7 BW (CH.5 COLOR)

Episodes
This is a list of episodes from the television show Honeybee Hutch in order by production number.

References

External links

1970 anime television series debuts
Japanese children's animated adventure television series
Adventure anime and manga
Fuji TV original programming
Tatsunoko Production
Animated television series about insects
Animated television series about orphans
Fictional bees